St. Nicholas Church is one of the oldest Eastern Orthodox churches in Vilnius, Lithuania. 

According to a popular legend, the first wooden Orthodox chapel located on the place of today's St. Nicholas church was built around 1340. Seven years later, the Vilnius martyrs were supposedly buried there. However, in 1350, Uliana of Tver, the second wife of prince Algirdas, ordered to build a new brick church. In 1514, this church was again replaced with a larger one. It remained Orthodox up to 1609, when, like most of Vilnius Orthodox churches, it was given to the Uniates on a personal order of the king Sigismund III Vasa. 

Around 1740 the church was completely destroyed by fire and rebuilt in Baroque style. In 1839, the Russian local government closed the Uniate parish and given the building back to the Orthodox. After the failed Polish January Uprising, it was completely rebuilt in Neo-Byzantine style on the personal initiative of general-governor of Vilnius Mikhail Nikolayevich Muravyov-Vilensky. The renewed church was to be another sign of Russian domination in the city, becoming the fifth Orthodox church in the Old Town of Vilnius. Muraviev ordered also the construction of St. Michael the Archangel chapel which was to commemorate his victory over the Polish uprising. In 1866, the whole church was reconsecrated. The general-governor's role in the reconstruction of the church was described on a marble plaque on the western wall of the church. 

After World War II, the church was closed, but in 1947, the Stalinist government agreed to reopen it as a parish church. The general renovation of the building took place before 1956.

References 
 G. Shlevis, Православные храмы Литвы, Vilnius 2006

Eastern Orthodox churches in Lithuania
Churches in Vilnius